X-Paroni (X-Baron) is a 1964 Finnish comedy and the debut of Spede Pasanen as a leading male role and debut as a co-writer and director of a full-length film.

Plot summary
The plot concerns a wealthy baron (Pasanen), who is so interested in foreign cultures (particularly Native American), that he is oblivious that people within his own organization are using him to fund a local mafia. While visiting the country-side the baron is mistaken for a lazy but inventive farmer (also Pasanen) who looks exactly like him and the two switch roles by accident. While the reserved baron manages to charm the simple people of the country-side his lookalike cracks down on the corruption within the baron's business-monopoly (often spoken of but never elaborated). This eventually leads the mob to attempt to assassinate the baron who then flees to the country-side after learning that he has a doppelgänger there as well.

Production
The film marked Spede's one and only time as a collaborative film-maker with Jaakko Pakkasvirta (who plays James in the film) and Risto Jarva. Although all three share writing-credit, Pasanen was mainly responsible for planning the comedy of the film. Of Spede's future collaborators, the film features a first appearance by Simo Salminen in a minor role, before he would appear more prominently in Millipilleri and several other future films.

The film introduced several conventions of Spede's later work such as gangsters, gadgetry, a luxuriously rich main protagonist and an intentionally fast-paced crazy comedy delivery. Similarly to his later films Noin 7 Veljestä, Speedy Gonzales - Noin Seitsemän Veljeksen Poika, Koeputkiaikuinen ja Simon enkelit and Tup-Akka-Lakko, Pasanen plays a dual-role.

External links

1964 films
Spede Pasanen
1960s Finnish-language films
1964 comedy films
Finnish comedy films